General Payne may refer to:

Elisha Payne (1731–1807), Vermont Militia major general
Frederick R. Payne Jr. (1911–2015), U.S. Marine Corps brigadier general
Morris B. Payne (1885-1961), Connecticut National Guard major general
William H. F. Payne (1830–1904), Confederate States Army brigadier general

See also
Sir William Payne-Gallwey, 1st Baronet (1759–1831), British Army general
General Paine (disambiguation)